The Klappan River is a major tributary of the Stikine River in northwestern British Columbia, Canada.  It flows north from an area known as the Sacred Headwaters, which is the source not only of this river but also of the Nass, Skeena, Spatsizi and Stikine Rivers.  The headwaters region is the site of a controversial coal-bed methane project.

See also
Klappan Range
Klappan Mountain

References
https://web.archive.org/web/20110706165819/http://archive.ilmb.gov.bc.ca/bcgn-bin/bcg10?name=5410

Stikine Country
Stikine Plateau
Rivers of British Columbia
Tributaries of the Stikine River
Cassiar Land District